The Aqua Line, also known as the East-West corridor, of the Nagpur Metro is a metro route of the mass rapid transit system in Nagpur, India. It was opened on 28 January 2020. 

The total length of the corridor is 19.407 km. with 21 stations from Prajapati Nagar to Hingna Mount View with a total distance of 19.407 km. All stations are elevated stations and Sitaburdi station is an Interchange Station. Average inter-station distance is 1.00 km approximately varying from 0.65 km to 1.29 km depending upon the site, operational and traffic requirements. This corridor originates from Prajapati Nagar and runs westwards, through Vaishnodevi Square, Ambedkar Square, Telephone Exchange, Chittar Oli Square, Agarsen Square, Doser Vaisya Square, Nagpur Railway Station, Sitaburdi, Jhansi Rani Square, Institute of Engineers, Shankar Nagar Square, Lad Square, Dharmpeth College, Subhash Nagar, Rachna (Ring road Junction), Vasudev Nagar, Bansi Nagar to Lomanya Nagar. The entire corridor is elevated.
 
The DMRC in its Detailed Project Report (DPR) submitted to Nagpur Improvement Trust has suggested to start the construction work on both the routes simultaneously contradicting the prior suggestion of phase wise development.

List of stations 
Following is a list of stations on this route-

See also 

 List of Nagpur Metro stations
 Maharashtra Metro Rail Corporation Limited
 Nagpur Metro
 Orange Line (Nagpur Metro)

Other Metro systems in India

References 

Nagpur Metro
Railway lines opened in 2020